Oliver–McFarlane syndrome is a condition characterized by hypertrichosis of the eyebrows and eyelashes.

See also 
 Ollier disease
 List of cutaneous conditions

References

External links 

Genodermatoses
Genetic disorders with OMIM but no gene
Syndromes